The Chongqing–Chengdu Expressway, commonly referred to as the Yurong Expressway and designated G5013, is a partially completed  that connects the cities of Chongqing and Chengdu. The Chongqing section of the expressway opened on 25 December 2013.

References

Chinese national-level expressways
Expressways in Chongqing
Expressways in Sichuan